Drasteria cailino is a moth of the family Erebidae first described by Alexandre Louis Lefèbvre de Cérisy in 1827. It is found in southern Europe, the Near East and Middle East up to the western Himalayas in the east. In the Levant, several isolated populations are present in Lebanon, Syria and Israel.

There are two generations per year. Adults are on wing in from May to July and in early autumn.

The larvae feed on Salix viminalis and Rosa canina.

Subspecies
Drasteria cailino cailino
Drasteria cailino medialba Wiltshire, 1961
Drasteria cailino tropicalis Hacker, 1999 (Saudi Arabia, Yemen)
Drasteria cailino orientalis Hacker, 1996 (Pakistan)

References

External links

BioLib

Drasteria
Moths of Europe
Moths of Asia
Moths described in 1827
Taxa named by Alexandre Louis Lefèbvre de Cérisy